The Touro Synagogue or Congregation Jeshuat Israel is a synagogue built in 1763 in Newport, Rhode Island. It is the oldest synagogue building still standing in the United States, the only surviving synagogue building in the U.S. dating to the colonial era, and the oldest surviving Jewish synagogue building in North America. In 1946, it was declared a National Historic Site.

The first congregation was made up of Sephardic Jews, who are believed to have come via the West Indies, where they participated in the triangular trade along with Dutch and English settlements. They practiced a Spanish and Portuguese Jewish liturgy and ritual. In the late eighteenth century, when warfare threatened, the congregation transferred the deed and Torah scrolls to Congregation Shearith Israel in New York for safekeeping. Since the late 19th century, the congregants have been primarily Ashkenazi.

In 2012 the two congregations went to court to try to resolve which owned the synagogue and its contents, as the Newport congregation wanted to sell some items to raise money for restoration of the building. In 2017 the United States Court of Appeals for the First Circuit ruled that the New York congregation owned it; as the US Supreme Court declined to hear the case, this ruling stands.

History

Touro Synagogue was designed by Peter Harrison, a noted British architect and Rhode Island resident. It is considered his most notable work. The interior is flanked by a series of twelve Ionic columns supporting balconies, which signify the twelve tribes of ancient Israel, and each column is carved from a single tree. The building is oriented to face east toward Jerusalem. The ark containing the Torah is on the east wall; above it is a mural representing the Ten Commandments in Hebrew, which was painted by Newport artist Benjamin Howland.

The Touro Synagogue was built from 1759 to 1763 for the Jeshuat Israel congregation in Newport under the leadership of Cantor (Chazzan) Isaac Touro. The cornerstone was laid by Aaron Lopez, a Newport-based philanthropist for Jewish causes who primarily made his fortune through the trading of candles and slaves (Lopez personally financed 30 slave voyages and enslaved almost a thousand Africans), in addition to being involved in the spermaceti candlemaking business and other commercial ventures. The Jeshuat Israel congregation dates to 1658, when 15 Spanish and Portuguese Jewish families arrived, probably from the Dutch or British West Indies. Many settled near Easton's Point. The synagogue was formally dedicated 2 December 1763. Other notable leaders include Abraham Pereira Mendes and Henry Samuel Morais (1900–01).

Judah Touro, the son of Isaac Touro and his wife Reyna, made a fortune as a merchant in New Orleans. He left $10,000 ($ in current dollar terms) in his will for the upkeep of the Jewish cemetery and synagogue in Newport.

In 1946, Touro Synagogue was designated as a National Historic Site, and it is an affiliated area of the National Park Service. The synagogue was listed on the National Register of Historic Places on October 15, 1966. In 2001, the congregation joined into a partnership with the National Trust for Historic Preservation.

The Touro Synagogue is located at 85 Touro Street and remains an active Orthodox synagogue. The building underwent a restoration in 2005–2006, and a recreation of the original dedication ceremony was conducted in 2013 in honor of the 250th anniversary.

Annual recitation of the Washington–Seixas letter on religious pluralism
On August 17, 1790, the day that President George Washington visited Newport, the synagogue's warden, Moses Seixas, wrote to Washington, expressing the support of the Congregation for Washington's administration and good wishes for him. 

Washington sent a letter on August 21 in response, which read in part: 

The Touro congregation annually reads President Washington's letter on religious pluralism and celebrates the occasion with invited speakers. They have included Supreme Court justices Ruth Bader Ginsburg and Elena Kagan; and Brown University presidents Ruth Simmons and Christina Paxson.

Congregation

The congregation at Newport, never large, was initially composed of Jews with roots in the Sephardic Spanish and Portuguese diaspora, and by the eighteenth century, with some Ashkenazim.

The first Jewish residents of Newport, fifteen Spanish Jewish families, arrived in 1658.  It is presumed that they arrived via the communities in Curaçao, home to the oldest active Jewish congregation in the Americas, dating to 1651, and Suriname. The small community worshiped in rooms in private homes for more than a century before they could afford to build a synagogue.

The community purchased and dedicated the Jewish Cemetery at Newport in 1677.

In the late 1700s, the Jewish community removed the Torah scrolls and sent them for safekeeping, along with the deed to the building, to Congregation Shearith Israel in New York. The keys left the Jewish community and were passed to the Goulds, a Quaker family in Newport.

From the 1850s on, the building was occasionally opened for worship for the convenience of summer visitors.  It was reopened on a regular basis in 1883 as Jewish life in Newport revived with the late nineteenth century immigration of eastern European Jews (Ashkenazim). The synagogue acquired a nearby building and ran a Hebrew school and other activities. It continues to serve as a thriving congregation with many year-round programs.

Although the congregation has been predominantly Ashkenazi for a century, it is constitutionally obliged to use the "Sephardic ritual.” It therefore uses the ArtScroll Nusach Sefard prayer book; once a year representatives of the New York Congregation Shearith Israel visit and hold a service in the Spanish and Portuguese style.

Rabbi Dr. Marc Mandel became the rabbi in July 2012. , the congregation consists of about 175 families.

Restoration

During 2005 and 2006, Touro Synagogue invested in a restoration project for its valued antique metal artifacts. In total, 150 metal objects, from eighteenth century hardware to European chandeliers and silver rimonim (ceremonial bells used on the Torah), needed to be rebuilt, have their surfaces stabilized, and have missing parts replaced. The project was carried out by the Newport-based restoration company Newmans Ltd.

Ownership controversy
Conflict over the ownership of the Touro building and its contents surfaced in 2012.  Newport's Congregation Jeshuat Israel put up for sale ceremonial bells, called rimonim, to the Museum of Fine Arts, Boston, for $7.4 million. New York's Congregation Shearith Israel sued the Newport congregation, saying that Shearith Israel owns the Touro synagogue building and its contents, based on the 18th century transfer of deed. They wanted to evict the Newport congregation from the Touro building and site. In April 2015 both sides of the dispute said several attempts at mediation had failed and they were preparing for trial.

In May 2016 a federal judge ruled on the matter, rejecting Congregation Shearith Israel's claim to oversight. U.S. District Judge John J. McConnell, Jr. noted that "for at least the past 20 years, Shearith Israel has not taken any meaningful action in its capacity as trustee for the Touro Synagogue and lands." In June 2016 Congregation Shearith Israel announced it would appeal the decision. Congregation Shearith Israel was awarded ownership on August 2, 2017 by the United States Court of Appeals for the First Circuit in Boston.

On March 18, 2019, the United States Supreme Court declined to take up the case; thus, the lower court ruling that Congregation Shearith Israel owns Touro stands.

Images

See also

 Touro Cemetery
 Touro Synagogue (New Orleans)
 Kahal Kadosh Beth Elohim
 Partners for Sacred Places
 List of the oldest synagogues in the United States
 National Register of Historic Places listings in Newport County, Rhode Island
 Slavery in Rhode Island

Explanatory notes

References

External links

Touro Synagogue Official Website
Touro Synagogue National Historic Site (National Park Service profile)
Washington's and Seixas' letters

Loeb Visitors Center (Starting point for tours of Touro Synagogue)

Religious buildings and structures completed in 1763
Religious organizations established in 1763
Jewish-American history
Orthodox synagogues in the United States
Spanish and Portuguese Jews
Synagogues in Rhode Island
Buildings and structures in Newport, Rhode Island
Sephardi Jews topics
Synagogues on the National Register of Historic Places in Rhode Island
Museums in Newport, Rhode Island
Jewish museums in the United States
18th-century synagogues
Religious museums in Rhode Island
Synagogues preserved as museums
Portuguese-American culture in Rhode Island
Portuguese-Jewish culture in the United States
Sephardi Jewish culture in the United States
Spanish-American culture in Rhode Island
Spanish-Jewish culture in the United States
Historic American Buildings Survey in Rhode Island
National Register of Historic Places in Newport, Rhode Island
1763 establishments in Rhode Island
Historic district contributing properties in Rhode Island
Sephardi synagogues